George Washington Cromer (May 13, 1856 – November 8, 1936) was an American lawyer and politician who served four terms as a U.S. Representative from Indiana from 1899 to 1907.

Early life and education 
Born near Anderson, Indiana, Cromer attended the common schools and Wittenberg College, Springfield, Ohio. He studied law and graduated from the Indiana University at Bloomington in 1882.

Career
He became editor of the Muncie (Indiana) Times in 1883. He was admitted to the bar in 1886 and commenced practice in Muncie, Indiana. He served as prosecuting attorney for the forty-sixth judicial circuit of Indiana 1886–1890, as member of the State Republican committee in 1892 and 1894, and as mayor of Muncie 1894–1898.

Congress 
Cromer was elected as a Republican to the Fifty-sixth and to the three succeeding Congresses (March 4, 1899 – March 3, 1907). He was an unsuccessful candidate for reelection in 1906 to the Sixtieth Congress.

Later career and death 
He resumed the practice of his profession in Muncie, Indiana until his death there at the age of 80, and was interred in Beech Grove Cemetery.

References

External links

George Washington Cromer entry at The Political Graveyard

1856 births
1936 deaths
Indiana lawyers
Indiana University alumni
Mayors of Muncie, Indiana
Politicians from Anderson, Indiana
Wittenberg University alumni
Burials in Indiana
Republican Party members of the United States House of Representatives from Indiana